The 2003 Big Ten men's basketball tournament was the postseason men's basketball tournament for the Big Ten Conference and played between March 13 and March 16, 2003 at United Center in Chicago, Illinois. The championship was won by Illinois who defeated Ohio State in the championship game. As a result, Illinois received the Big Ten's automatic bid to the NCAA tournament. The win marked Illinois' first tournament championship following two prior championship game appearances.

Seeds
All Big Ten schools played in the tournament. Teams were seeded by conference record, with a tiebreaker system used to seed teams with identical conference records. Seeding for the tournament was determined at the close of the regular conference season. The top five teams received a first round bye.

Bracket

Honors

All-Tournament Team
 Brian Cook, Illinois – Big Ten tournament Most Outstanding Player
 Roger Powell, Illinois
 Tom Coverdale, Indiana
 Brent Darby, Ohio State
 Sean Connolly, Ohio State

References

Big Ten men's basketball tournament
Tournament
Big Ten Conference men's basketball tournament
Big Ten men's basketball tournament